Marshall Station (formerly, Grabners and Marshall Junction) is a former settlement in Fresno County, California.

The Grabners post office operated from 1914 to 1933 and from 1939 to 1951. Grabners was named in honor of a local landowner.

References

Former settlements in Fresno County, California
Former populated places in California